The Aston Martin Rapide Bertone Jet 2+2 is a one-off shooting brake designed by car enthusiast Barry Weir and the last ever vehicle to be built by legendary car maker Gruppo Bertone. It was shown at the 2013 Geneva Motor Show.

The car was intended as a one-off special only but considering the positive response, Bertone decided to put the car into small scale production. The company went into receivership shortly after and the production run didn't come to fruition. The Bertone Jet 2+2 pays homage to the original Aston Martin DB4 GT Jet which was launched in 1961.

History
The project was undertaken in the request of renowned car collector Barry Weir in the Summer of 2012. Mr Weir designed the car on the back of a serviette as he came up with the idea of reshaping the back of  an Aston Martin Rapide to turn it into a shooting brake vehicle. The rear of the car took three and a half months to design and the final design was frozen because Aston Martin's chief designer Marek Reichman urged the designers at Bertone to use the updated grille design of the Rapide for the front of the car.

The final design was shown to the design team at Aston Martin and after approval, a full size clay model was built in order to smoothen out any imperfections. After the design was finalised, the coach work was performed by hand and the car was completed in 2013. The Aston Martin Jet 2+2 was unveiled to critical acclaim at the 2013 Geneva Motor Show.

Specifications
The Bertone Jet features aluminium body panels shaped by hand and carbon fibre body work. The car also features a panoramic sunroof made entirely of glass and folding rear seats. A roof dimming system was said to have been in development as well as electric folding rear seats. The headroom is improved at the rear seats due to the car's shooting brake body style but the legroom remains the same because the engineers and designers did not want to change the overall proportions of the donor car.

The rear lights are similar to the Vanquish and a small integrated rear spoiler is installed to improve aerodynamics.

Gallery

References

External links

Rapide Bertone Jet 2+2
Grand tourers